Aka, also known as Yaka or Beka, is a Bantu language spoken in the Central African Republic and Republic of Congo, along the Ubangi River dividing the two countries.

Aka is spoken by the Aka people, pygmies closely related to the Ubangian-speaking Baka of Cameroon, Congo and Gabon. Together, these peoples are known as the Mbenga (Bambenga) or Binga (Babinga), the latter derogatory.

Famously, Aka shares vocabulary with the Baka languages, mostly concerning a specialised forest economy, such as words for edible plants, medicinal plants and honey collecting. This is among the 30% of Aka which is not Bantu and the 30% of Baka which is not Ubangian and has been posited as the remnant of an ancestral Western Pygmy (Mbenga or "Baaka") language which has otherwise vanished. However, it is entirely possible that the Aka shifted to Bantu from a Ubangian language related to Baka, in which case the situation reduces to a single ethnic group adapted to the forest with correspondingly specialised vocabulary. There is no evidence for a wider linguistic affiliation with any of the other Pygmy peoples.

The Aka people call themselves Mraka in the singular and Beka in the plural. The people and their language go by various alternate spellings: Mò-Áka, Moyaka, Bayaka, Yaga, Bayaga, Gbayaka, Biaka, Beká, Yakwa, Yakpa, Yakpwa, Nyoyaka. The western Aka are known as the Benzele (Mbenzélé, Babenzélé, Bambenzele, Ba-Benjelle), and the eastern Aka as the Sese (Basese). These might be distinct dialects; Nzari might be another.

Pygmies of northern Gabon called the Mikaya and Luma are evidently either Aka or speak a language closely related to Aka.

Phonology

Consonants

Vowels

Specialized forest vocabulary
Some vocabulary with nearby Baka:

Literature
 Serge Bahuchet (2012): "Changing Language, Remaining Pygmy." Human Biology: Vol. 84: Iss. 1, Article 9.

References

Ngondi-Ngiri languages
African Pygmies
Languages of the Central African Republic
Languages of the Republic of the Congo

mk:Акаски јазик